Georgia elected its members October 7, 1816.

See also 
 Georgia's at-large congressional district special election, 1816
 United States House of Representatives elections, 1816 and 1817
 List of United States representatives from Georgia

1816
Georgia
United States House of Representatives